Charles Herman Older (September 29, 1917 – June 17, 2006) was an American who was the third highest scoring ace of the American Volunteer Group (the "Flying Tigers") and later the judge in the Charles Manson murder trial.

Early life
Older was born in Hanford, California on September 29, 1917.

He earned a degree in political science from the University of California, Los Angeles in 1939.

Military service

He became a pilot in the Marine Corps Reserve, but resigned to join the American Volunteer Group, better known as the Flying Tigers, to fight the Japanese prior to the United States entry into World War II. A member of the 3rd Pursuit Squadron (the "Hell's Angels"), he is credited with 10 victories, making him a double ace. By the end of the war, he had been promoted to lieutenant colonel.

In 1950, he was called back to active duty, flying the Douglas B-26 Invader in the Korean War.

Law career
He graduated from University of Southern California law school in 1952. After a distinguished legal career, he was appointed to the bench of the Los Angeles Superior Court by Governor Ronald Reagan in 1967. Older served for 20 years before retiring.

His most famous case was the Charles Manson trial. The trial lasted 10 months, the longest in American history at the time. Prosecutor Vincent Bugliosi praised Older for his firm but fair handling of the difficult case. At one point, Manson tried to attack the judge and had to be restrained by bailiffs.

Death
On June 17, 2006, he died at the age of 88 of complications from a fall in his home in West Los Angeles. He was survived by his wife, Catherine Day Older, and three daughters.

References

External links
 Autobiography

1917 births
2006 deaths
20th-century American judges
United States Marine Corps officers
Flying Tigers
American World War II flying aces
United States Air Force personnel of the Korean War
American Korean War bomber pilots
Aviators from California
California state court judges
USC Gould School of Law alumni
University of California, Los Angeles alumni
Accidental deaths from falls
Accidental deaths in California